The Valencian Regional Exhibition was held in Valencia in 1909, the year before  a national exhibition.

The fair was organised by the Commercial Athenaeum of Valencia, and ran from 22 May to 22 December 1909.

Legacy 
The Valencian anthem, Himne de l'Exposició, was composed for the exhibition.

Architecture 
The reinforced concrete Bridge of the Exposición Regional Valenciana 1909 was built, and remained until destroyed by a flood in 1957.

Three buildings were decided in advance of the fair to be retained: the Municipal Palace; the Nursing Home and the Industry Palace.

The municipal palace was designed by Francisco Mora Berenguer and built in 70 days.

References 

1909 in Spain
Culture in Valencia
Events in the Valencian Community
History of Dijon
World's fairs in Valencia
Valencian culture